Hall's Beer Cheese, is a beer cheese spread made in central Kentucky since the 1960s. The name comes from Hall's on the River, a Winchester, Kentucky restaurant that popularized the item.

Awards and recognition
 People's Choice Winner at the 2016 Annual Beer Cheese Festival.
 Best Beer Cheese award at the 2015 Annual Beer Cheese Festival.

See also
 List of spreads

References

External links
 Official website

Spreads (food)
Brand name dairy products
Kentucky cuisine
Processed cheese
Winchester, Kentucky